The Princeton Center Historic District is a historic district encompassing the 19th century center of Princeton, Massachusetts. The district is centered at the junction of Hubbardston and Mountain Roads, and includes the town common, town hall, public library, and First Congregational Church.

See also
Russell Corner Historic District
West Village Historic District (Princeton, Massachusetts)
East Princeton Village Historic District
National Register of Historic Places listings in Worcester County, Massachusetts

References

Buildings and structures in Princeton, Massachusetts
Historic districts in Worcester County, Massachusetts
Historic districts on the National Register of Historic Places in Massachusetts
National Register of Historic Places in Worcester County, Massachusetts